(Sing a new song to the Lord), BWV 90.2, BWV190a, is a cantata by Johann Sebastian Bach. The work was written in 1730 in commemoration of the Augsburg Confession.

History and text 
It uses a text by Picander, published in 1732 in  part 3, in Leipzig. The first movement adapts words from Psalms 149 and 150. The second movement is based on the beginning of Martin Luther's German Te Deum, "".

The closing chorale was the third stanza of Luther's "" (1523).

The cantata's music is lost. Diethard Hellmann wrote a reconstruction in 1972.

Structure 
The work has seven movements:
 Chorus: 
 Chorale and recitative (alto, tenor, bass): 
 Aria (alto): 
 Recitative (bass): 
 Aria (tenor, bass): 
 Recitative (tenor): 
 Chorale:

Recordings 
Bachchor und Bachorchester Mainz, Diethard Hellmann. Bach Kantaten, Vol. 1: BWV 190a, BWV 84, BWV 89, BWV 27. DdM-Records Mitterteich, 1998.

References 

1730 compositions
Church cantatas by Johann Sebastian Bach
Psalm-related compositions by Johann Sebastian Bach